The 1987 National Soccer League season was the 11th season of the National Soccer League, the former top Australian professional league for association football clubs since its establishment in 1977. The season saw the format returned to a single league of fourteen teams instead of the two-conference system.  Sydney City SC withdrew from the competition after round 1, reducing the competition to 13 teams. The finals series for the Championship was also removed and replaced with the standard non-Championship defining play-offs with the actual Championship determined by a first past the post, won by APIA Leichhardt.

Teams
'' Note: Table lists in alphabetical order.

Regular season

League table

Results

Finals series
A top five Finals series was played at the end of the regular season. The Finals series was not considered the Championship for this season.

Preliminary semi-final

Elimination semi-final

Minor semi-final

Major semi-final

Preliminary Final

Grand Final

Season statistics

Top scorers

Hat-tricks

Awards

References
 OzFootball Archives – 1987 NSL Season

National Soccer League (Australia) seasons
1
Aus